Call of the Shofar is a Jewish self-help and self-awareness organization.

Call of the Shofar or Kol Shofar may also refer to:

The Call of the Shofar and Other Stories, a children's storybook by Dr. Nissan Mindel
Congregation Kol Shofar, a Conservative congregation in Belvedere, California

See also
Shofar blowing